Raghunath Vishwanath Deshpande (born 16 March 1947) is an Indian politician who was the Minister of state for Revenue Department of Karnataka 8 June 2018 to 23 July 2019. Member of the Legislative Assembly for the Haliyal constituency and he was the Minister for Medium & Heavy Industries in the cabinets headed by Siddaramaiah as well as S. M. Krishna.

Political career
Raghunath holds B.A. and L.L.B. degrees. He began his political career as the President of the Karnataka State Co-operative Agriculture & Rural Development Bank.

An eight-term MLA, Deshpande started his political career in the Janata Parivar before joining the Indian National Congress in 1999. He served as Industries minister for 13 years between 1994 and 2004 and 2015 to 2018.

Achievements
During his tenure as a Minister for Medium and Heavy Industries, he was known for industrial development of Karnataka. And during his stint in Higher Education and Tourism ministry, Deshpande had taken several initiatives for the development of education and tourism in Karnataka. A new draft called the Tourism Trade Facilitation Act was prepared to ensure the safety of tourists coming to the state.

References

External links
R. V. Deshpande affidavit

People from Uttara Kannada
1947 births
Living people
Indian National Congress politicians from Karnataka
Karnataka MLAs 2018–2023
Lok Shakti politicians